Shay Sibony (born 3 April 1983) is an Israeli footballer currently playing for Maccabi Ironi Kiryat Ata.

External links
 

1983 births
Living people
Israeli Jews
Israeli footballers
Hapoel Haifa F.C. players
Maccabi Ahi Nazareth F.C. players
Maccabi Ironi Kiryat Ata F.C. players
Ironi Tiberias F.C. players
Maccabi Ironi Tamra F.C. players
Israeli Premier League players
Liga Leumit players
Footballers from Haifa
Israeli people of Moroccan-Jewish descent
Association football midfielders